Security Paper Mill (acronymed TAKAB) is a paper mill and a subsidiary of the Central Bank of Iran responsible for production of security papers, including those of the Iranian rial banknotes.

References

External links
Security Paper Mill 

Pulp and paper mills
Amol County
2002 establishments in Iran